PTB may refer to:

Government and politics 
 Bermuda Public Transportation Board
 Bessarabian Peasants' Party, a political party in the Kingdom of Romania
 Brazilian Labour Party (historical), dismantled after the 1964 military-led coup d'état
 Brazilian Labour Party (current), founded 1981
 Pakistan Tobacco Board
 Party of Labour of Burkina, a political party in Burkina Faso
 Physikalisch-Technische Bundesanstalt, the national metrology institute of Germany
 Workers' Party of Belgium, a Belgian political party

Science and medicine
 N-Phenacylthiazolium bromide,  a cross-link breaker
 Permian-Triassic boundary, a mass extinction event
 Phosphotyrosine-binding domain (PTB-domain), a protein domain
 Polypyrimidine tract-binding protein, an RNA-binding protein
 Pulmonary tuberculosis, manifestation of tuberculosis in the lungs

Technology
 Project team builder, a project management simulator
 Public Test Build, of the game Dead by Daylight
 Push to break, electronics push switch 
 Packet Too Big, an ICMPv6 message; see IPv6 packet
 Pounds of salt per thousand barrels of crude oil; see Desalter
 .ptb, a file extension used by musical tablature authoring tool Power Tab Editor

Transport 
 Pentre-bach railway station, in Wales
 Petit train de banlieue, a passenger train in Senegal
 Petersburg station, an Amtrak station serving Petersburg, Virginia
 Voepass Linhas Aéreas, a Brazilian airline
 PTB Group, in Iran

Other uses
 P.T.B (album), by rapcore group Kingspade
 Placer Theatre Ballet, an American ballet company
 Portland Trail Blazers, an American professional basketball team
 Proto-Tibeto-Burman language
 Proto-Torres-Banks language, a reconstructed language from Vanuatu

See also
 The powers that be (disambiguation)